The 1963 World University Men's Handball Championship was the first edition of the indoor World Cup for students.

Preliminary round

Group A

Group B 

Bulgaria withdraw from the competition. On the first match day Germany played against the local handball club H43 Lund.

Placement games

Third place game

Final

Final ranking 
According to the Romanian Handball Federation following was the final ranking:

Teams 
Rumania
Virgil Tale, Ioan Bogolea, Valentin Samungi, Cornel Oțelea, Ion Popescu, Mihai Fabian, Adrian Jianu, Liviu Constantinescu, Mihail Marinescu, Ion Paraschiv, Francisc Pall, Mircea Duca, Gheorghe Gruia, Adrian Jianu

Coach: Eugen Trofin

References 

2021 Men
World University Men's Handball Championship
World University Men's Handball Championship
International handball competitions hosted by Sweden